Richard Charles Washington, Jr. (born April 12, 1985) is a former American football player. He played college football as a defensive lineman for the University of Delaware before transferring to Clark Atlanta University. He played for the Arkansas Diamonds of the Indoor Football League (IFL) in 2010. 

He was assigned to the Georgia Force of the Arena Football League (AFL) on September 29, 2010, and was traded to the Kansas City Command on November 15, 2010, in exchange for future considerations. He was traded to the Jacksonville Sharks on December 7, 2010, in exchange for future considerations. He was placed on injured reserve on May 19, 2011.

He was assigned to the Command on October 17, 2011. He was placed on injured reserve on July 12, 2012. On August 23, 2012, the Command announced the team would not play in 2013, and eventually ceased operations.

Personal life
Washington attended Plantation High School in Plantation, Florida. He earned a full scholarship to multiple Division 1 schools such as North Carolina State and Wake Forest but did not academically qualify.

References

External links
 Just Sports Stats
 Delaware Fighting Blue Hens Bio
 Jacksonville Sharks Bio

1985 births
Living people
American football defensive linemen
Arkansas Diamonds players
Delaware Fightin' Blue Hens football players
Clark Atlanta Panthers football players
Jacksonville Sharks players
Players of American football from Miami
Players of American football from Fort Lauderdale, Florida
People from Plantation, Florida
Kansas City Command players
Sportspeople from Broward County, Florida